Paul Carl Leygebe (1664, Nuremberg - 1756, Berlin) was a German painter and anatomy professor at the Prussian Academy of Arts in Berlin.

Life and works 
He was the son of Gottfried Christian Leygebe (1630-1683), a sculptor and medallist, originally from Freystadt, who had come to Nuremberg to train as an armorer. In 1668, his father moved the family to Berlin to seek greater opportunities.

From 1699 to 1756, he was a member of the Prussian Academy of Arts. From 1715 until 1755 he was an art teacher and Professor of anatomy there.

He was also an official court painter and created large canvases with scenes depicting the activities of Frederick William, Elector of Brandenburg, King Frederick William I and King Frederick the Great. Among his first works in that capacity (1695) was a monumental painting; "Triumphal Entry of the Great Elector" in King Frederick's bridal chamber.

Later, from 1701 to 1704, he created a ceiling plafond in the "Roten Samtkammer" (Red Velvet Chamber) at the Royal Residence, with an allegory of "Dawn, Sunset, Evening and Night", showing constellations as they were on the day of King Frederick's coronation. These were done under the supervision of Andreas Schlüter, the Court Architect.

He apparently stopped painting around 1730. Much of his work was destroyed or damaged during World War II and the subsequent Communist régime.

References

Further reading 
 Paul Karl Leygebe. In: Friedrich Nicolai: Beschreibung der Königlichen Residenzstädte Berlin und Potsdam und alle daselbst befindliche Merkwürdigkeiten. Nebst einem Anhange, enthaltend die Leben aller Künstler, die seit Churfürst Friedrich Wilhelms des Großen Zeiten in Berlin gelebet haben, oder deren Kunstwerke daselbst befindlich sind, Berlin 1769, pg.68, Online @ Google Books (In Fraktur)

External links 

1664 births
1756 deaths
18th-century German painters
18th-century German male artists
German portrait painters
German muralists
Academic staff of the Prussian Academy of Arts
17th-century German painters
Artists from Nuremberg